River Bourne may refer to:

 the River Bourne, Dorset, a river in Dorset that gives its name to Bournemouth
 the River Bourne, Wiltshire, a tributary of the River Avon in the English county of Wiltshire
 the River Bourne, Berkshire, a tributary of the River Pang in the English county of Berkshire
 the Bourne Eau, a tributary of the River Welland in Lincolnshire
 the River Bourne in Surrey which has two branches and are easily confused. Their confluence is near St George's College, Weybridge. Then the river becomes a tributary of the River Thames:
the River Bourne, Chertsey which flows through Chertsey
 the River Bourne, Addlestone which flows through Chobham and Addlestone
 the River Bourne, Kent, a tributary of the River Medway
 the River Bourne, Warwickshire, a tributary of the River Tame, West Midlands. The confluence is near Whitacre Junction railway station